Smash Lab is a reality television series that premiered on December 26, 2007, on the Discovery Channel. The idea of the show is to take everyday technology and test it in "extraordinary ways".

The show started broadcasting in the UK on 3 March 2014 on Discovery Turbo and 7 April on Community Channel with Tony Hirst as the narrator. Discovery Turbo only aired 10 episodes, whereas Community Channel showed all 20 episodes.

Cast
The Smash Lab team is composed of Deanne Bell (scientist), Chuck Messer (engineer), Nick Blair (designer, season 1 only), Kevin Cook (creative expert, season 1 only), Reverend Gadget (fabricator, season 2 only), and Nathaniel Taylor (artisan, season 2 only). Blair has a degree in industrial design, and both Bell and Cook have degrees in mechanical engineering. Messer has an undergraduate degree in industrial engineering as well as a graduate degree in industrial design.

Episodes

Season 1 (2007–08)
Smash Lab premiered on December 26, 2007. The Smash Lab team for season one was composed of Deanne Bell, Chuck Messer, Nick Blair, and Kevin Cook.

Season 2 (2008)
Smash Lab was picked up for a second season with episodes beginning August 5, 2008. For the second season, two team members changed: Nick Blair and Kevin Cook were replaced by Reverend Gadget and Nathaniel Taylor (artisan). Gadget has appeared on other Discovery Channel shows, including Big! and Monster House. This season is narrated by comedian Ben Bailey, host of Cash Cab. The show was not renewed for a third season.

References

External links

Discovery Channel original programming
2007 American television series debuts
2009 American television series endings
2000s American reality television series
English-language television shows